Harry Posting Chadwick (13 November 1927 – 23 March 2020) was a member of the House of Commons of Canada from 1988 to 1993. His background was in the automobile industry, was a receiver and also worked in a warehouse.

Chadwick was a city alderman in Brampton for 10 years. He was elected to federal office in the 1988 federal election at the Brampton—Malton electoral district for the Progressive Conservative party. He served in the 34th Canadian Parliament but lost to Gurbax Malhi of the Liberal Party in the 1993 federal election. In 1990, the riding name changed from Brampton—Malton to Bramalea-Gore-Malton via a Private Members Bill tabled by Mr. Chadwick (see Statutes of Canada, 1990, Ch. 23).

Chadwick died from a years long battle with cancer on 23 March 2020.

References

External links

Legal Measures Governing Changes in Federal Electoral Districts

1927 births
2020 deaths
Members of the House of Commons of Canada from Ontario
Politicians from Toronto
Progressive Conservative Party of Canada MPs